Bruno Bräuer (4 February 1893 – 20 May 1947) was a general in the paratroop forces of Nazi Germany during World War II. He served as a commander on Crete (called Fortress Crete by the Germans) and then commanded the 9th Paratroop Division. After the war, he was convicted of war crimes and executed, along with Friedrich-Wilhelm Müller, on the anniversary of the Axis invasion of Crete.

World War II
In November 1942 Bräuer replaced General Alexander Andrae as commander on Crete. On 25 March 1943, Greek Independence Day, he released 100 Cretans jailed in Agia prison. Among them was Constantinos Mitsotakis, who later became MP and Prime Minister of Greece. After German failures at Stalingrad and El Alamein, Bräuer ordered the construction of underground command bunkers, more defenses around Suda Bay and increased ammunition stocks. He was replaced by General Friedrich-Wilhelm Müller 31 May 1944.

In January 1945, the German 9th Parachute Division was formed under Bräuer, mostly made up of Luftwaffe ground forces. In January 1945 two of his battalions were encircled by the 1st Ukrainian Front in Breslau, where they were destroyed. The rest of the division retreated back to the Seelow Heights. Many of the troops fled when the Soviet barrage began. Before long, the line had nearly completely collapsed and many of Bräuer's men began to desert. He suffered a nervous collapse and was relieved of his command.

Conviction and execution
After his capture by the British he was extradited to Greece for the deportation of the Cretan Jewish Greeks in May 1944 and put on trial there. (At the end of May 1944, the Jewish citizens of Crete were arrested and shipped on the Danae to continental Europe. On June 8, the ship was sunk by HMS Vivid.) Along with General Friedrich-Wilhelm Müller, Bräuer was charged with war crimes by a Greek military court. He stood trial in Athens for atrocities on Crete. Under the prosecution of Admiral Nicholas Zacharias, the Greek naval prosecutor, Bräuer was accused of the deaths of 3,000 Cretans, massacres, systematic terrorism, deportation, pillage, wanton destruction, torture and ill treatment. Bräuer was convicted and sentenced to death on 9 December 1946. He was executed by firing squad at 5 o'clock on 20 May 1947, the anniversary of the Axis invasion of Crete. Historian Antony Beevor called him "a truly unfortunate man", having been executed for crimes "committed under another general".

Awards
 Iron Cross (1914) 2nd Class (15 October 1914) & 1st Class (1 April 1917)
 Clasp to the Iron Cross (1939) 2nd Class (20 October 1939) & 1st Class (23 May 1940)
 Knight's Cross of the Iron Cross on 24 May 1940 as commander of Fallschjäger-Regiment 1
 German Cross in Gold on 31 March 1942 as commander of Fallschjäger-Regiment 1

References

Citations

Bibliography
Beevor, Antony (1991). Crete, the battle and the resistance
Beevor, Antony (2002). Berlin, the downfall 1945, Penguin Books, 
 
 
 

1893 births
1947 deaths
People from the Province of Silesia
People from Jawor County
Recipients of the Knight's Cross of the Iron Cross
Crete in World War II
German occupation of Greece during World War II
Generals of Parachute Troops
Luftwaffe personnel convicted of war crimes
Nazis executed in Greece
Executed military leaders